Niranjan Jena (1 August 1916 – 18 July 1983) was an Indian politician. He was elected to the Lok Sabha, the lower house of the Parliament of India as a member of the Indian National Congress.

Jena died in Cuttack on 18 July 1983, at the age of 66.

References

External links
 Official biographical sketch in Parliament of India website

1916 births
1983 deaths
India MPs 1952–1957
Indian National Congress politicians from Odisha
Lok Sabha members from Odisha